Mar Peter Michael Chenaparampil (8 December 1929 – 18 April 2013) was the Roman Catholic bishop of the Diocese of Alleppey, India.

Ordained to the priesthood in 1956, Bishop Peter M Chenaparampil was named bishop in 1984 and resigned in 2001. He later moved to St. Martin de Poress hospital Cherukunn, Kannur and worked there for few years. He died in April 2013 at the age of 83 (eighty three years and three months).

Notes

1929 births
2013 deaths
20th-century Roman Catholic bishops in India